The Chipewyan (also called  Denésoliné or Dënesųłı̨né or Dënë Sųłınë́, meaning "the original/real people")  are a Dene Indigenous Canadian people of the Athabaskan language family, whose ancestors are identified with the Taltheilei Shale archaeological tradition.  They are part of the Northern Athabascan group of peoples, and come from what is now Western Canada.

Terminology 

The term Chipewyan (ᒌᐘᔮᐣ) is a Cree exonym meaning pointed hides, referring to the design of their parkas.

The French-speaking missionaries to the northwest of the Red River Colony referred to the Chipewyan people as Montagnais in their documents written in French. Montagnais simply means "mountain people" or "highlanders" in French and has been applied to many unrelated nations across North America over time. For example the Neenolino Innu of northern Quebec are also called "Montagnais".

Demographics
Chipewyan peoples live in the region spanning the western Canadian Shield to the Northwest Territories, including northern parts of the provinces of Manitoba, Alberta and Saskatchewan. There are also many burial and archaeological sites in Nunavut which are part of the Dënesųłı̨ne group.

The following list of First Nations band governments had in August 2016 a total registered membership of 25,519, with 11,315 in Saskatchewan, 6,952 in Alberta, 3,038 in Manitoba and 4,214 in the Northwest Territories. All had Denesuline populations; however, several had a combination of Cree and Denesuline members (see the Barren Lands First Nation in Manitoba and the Fort McMurray First Nation in Alberta).

There are also many Dene (Dënesųlı̨ne)-speaking Métis communities located throughout the region. The Saskatchewan village of La Loche, for example, had 2,300 residents who in the 2011 census identified as speaking Dene (Denesuline) as their native language. About 1,800 of the residents were Métis and about 600 were members of the Clearwater River Dene Nation.

Commemorations 
The relocation of the Sayisi Dene is commemorated by the Dene Memorial in Churchill Manitoba.

Governance
The Dënesųłı̨ne people are part of many band governments spanning Alberta, Saskatchewan, Manitoba and the Northwest Territories.

Alberta
Athabasca Tribal Council
 Athabasca Chipewyan First Nation. Reserves: Fort Chipewyan (K'aı́tël koę) Chipewyan #201, 201A, 201B, 201C, 201D, 201E, 201F, 201G, c. 348 km2, Population: 1,200
 Fort McKay First Nation. Reserves: Fort McKay #174, 174C, 174D, Namur Lake #174B, 174A, c. 149 km2. Population: 851
 Chipewyan Prairie First Nation (Tł'ógh tëlı́ dënesųłı̨ne) Reserves: Cowper Lake #194A, Janvier #194, Winefred Lake (Ɂuldázé tué) #194B, c. 31 km2. Population: 923
 Fort McMurray First Nation (Tthı̨dłı̨ kuę́ ). Reserves: Fort McMurray #468, Clearwater #175, Gregoire Lake #176, 176A, 176B, c. 31 km2. Population: 763
 Mikisew Cree First Nation, despite the name, the population of this band is mixed with a "little over fifty percent" having Chipewyan ancestry in 2020 according to a former chief, whose own mother was Dene.
Tribal Chiefs Association (TCA)
 Cold Lake First Nations (Łué chógh tué). Reserves: Cold Lake #149, 149A, 149B, 149C, c. 209 km2. Population: 2,858
Akaitcho Territory Government (ATG) (Ɂákéchógh nęnę)
Smith's Landing First Nation. 'Thebati Dene Suhne' Tthëbátthı́ dënesųłı̨ne, Thebacha Tthëbáchághë - 'beside the rapids', the Dene name for Fort Smith. Reserves and communities: ?ejere K'elni Kue #196I, Hokedhe Túe #196E, K'i Túe #196D, Li Dezé #196C, Thabacha Náre #196A, Thebathi #196, Tsu K'adhe Túe #196F, Tsu Nedehe Túe #196H, Tsu Túe Ts'u tué #196G,  #196B, c. 100 km². Population: 357

Manitoba
Keewatin Tribal Council
 Barren Lands (Brochet Kuę́) First Nation has a Cree and Dene population. Reserve: Brochet #197, c. 43 km2. Population: 1,139
 Northlands First Nation also known as Northlands Denesuline First Nation. Reserves and communities: Lac Brochet (Dálú tué), Lac Brochet #197A, Sheth chok, Thuycholeeni, Thuycholeeni azé, Tthekalé nu, c. 22 km2. Population: 1,082
 Sayisi Dene First Nation formerly known as 'Fort Churchill Indian Band'. Reserve: Churchill 1, c. 2 km2. Population: 817

Northwest Territories
Akaitcho Territory Government (ATG)
 Deninu Kue First Nation ('Deneh-noo-kweh' - 'People of moose island'), formerly known as 'Fort Resolution Dene'. Reserve: Fort Resolution Settlement Population (2015): 910
 Lutsel K'e Dene First Nation (Lutselk'e 'Loot-sel-kk ay' - 'place of the Łutsel-fish'), formerly known as 'Snowdrift Band'. Reserve: Snowdrift Settlement. Population (2015): 782
 Salt River First Nation#195 Reserves: Fort Smith Settlement, Salt Plains #195, Salt River #195, Fitzgerald #196 (Alberta), c. 230 km2. Population (2015): 971
 Yellowknives Dene First Nation Reserves: Dettah Settlement, N'Dilo Settlement, Yellowknife Settlement. Population (2015) 1 551

Saskatchewan

Meadow Lake Tribal Council (Tł'ogh tué)
Buffalo River Dene Nation (Ɂëjëre dësché) located at Dillon. The reserve is about 84 km north east of Île-à-la-Crosse (Kuę́ ). Reserve: Buffalo River Dene Nation No. 193, c. 83 km2. Population: 1,405
Clearwater River Dene Nation (Tı̨tëlase tué) Its most populous reserve Clearwater River borders the village of La Loche to the north. Reserves: Clearwater River Dene Nos. 222, 221, and 223, La Loche Indian Settlement c. 95 km2. Population: 2,042
English River First Nation with offices at Patuanak signed Treaty 10 in 1906 under Chief William Apesis. The name originates from the English River where the "poplar house people" (Kés-ye-hot'ı̨në) inhabited the area for periods during the year. Most families, who now reside in Patuanak (Bëghą́nı̨ch'ërë) and La Plonge 192 by Beauval had traditionally lived down river at Primeau Lake, Knee Lake and Dipper Lake. Reserves: Cree Lake No. 192G, Porter Island No. 192H, Elak Dase No. 192A, Knee Lake No. 192B, Dipper Rapids No. 192C, Wapachewunak No. 192D, LaPlonge No. 192, c. 200 km2. Population: 1,528
Birch Narrows First Nation (K'ı́t'ádhı̨ká ) located at Turnor Lake, most populous Reserve No. 193B is about 124 km northeast of Île-à-la-Crosse, the reserve originated from Treaty 6 in 1906, Reserves: Churchill Lake No. 193A, Turnor Lake Nos. 193B and 194, c. 30 km2. Population: 771
Prince Albert Grand Council (PAGC)
Black Lake Dene Nation (Tázën tué) located at Black Lake, most populous reserve Chicken No. 224 about c. 170 km southeast of Uranium City (Tsókı̨në), formerly known as 'Stony Rapids (Dëschághë) Band. Reserves: Chicken Nos. 224, 225, and 226, c. 322 km2. Population: 2,111
Hatchet Lake Dene Nation (Tthëłtué) also known as "Lac la Hache Denesuline First Nation" is located at Wollaston Lake, c. 354 km north of Flin Flon, Reserve: Lac la Hache No. 220, c. 110 km2. Population: 1,829
Fond du Lac Dene Nation (Gąnı́ kuę́ ) is located at Fond-du-Lac. The most populous reserve Fond Du Lac No. 227 is east of Lake Athabasca. Reserves: Fond Du Lac Nos. 227, 228, 229, 231, 232, 233, c. 368 km2. Population: 1,989

Historical Chipewyan regional groups 

The Chipewyan moved in small groups or bands, consisting of several extended families, alternating between winter and summer camps. The groups participated in hunting, trapping, fishing and gathering in Canada's boreal forest and around the many lakes of their territory. Later, with the emerging North American fur trade, they organized into several major regional groups in the vicinity of the European trading posts to control, as middleman, the carrying trade in furs and the hunting of fur-bearing animals. The new social groupings also enabled the Chipewyan to dominate their Dene neighbors and to better defend themselves against their rifle-armed Cree enemies, who were advancing to the Peace River and Lake Athabasca.

 Kaí-theli-ke-hot!ínne (K'aı́tëlı́ hót'ı̨ne) ('willow flat-country up they-dwell') lived on the western shore of Lake Athabasca at Fort Chipewyan. Their tribal area extended northward to Fort Smith on the Slave River and south to Fort McMurray on the Athabasca River)
 Kés-ye-hot!ínne (K'ësyëhót'ı̨ne) ('aspen house they-dwell' or 'poplar house they-dwell') lived on the upper reaches of the Churchill River, along the Lac Île-à-la-Crosse, Methye Portage, Cold Lake, Heart Lake and Onion Lake. The tribal name is probably a description of adjacent Chipewyan groups for this major regional group and takes literally reference to the Lac Ile à la Crosse established European trading forts which were built with Poplar or Aspen wood.
 Hoteladi Hótthę̈nádé dëne ('northern people') lived north of the Kés-ye-hot!ínne between Cree Lake, west of Reindeer Lake on the south and on the east shore of Lake Athabasca in the north.
 Hâthél-hot!inne (Hátthëlót'ı̨ne) ('lowland they-dwell') lived in the Reindeer Lake (ɂëtthën tué) Region which drains south into the Churchill River.
 Etthen eldili dene (Etthén heldélį Dené, Ethen-eldeli - 'Caribou-Eaters') lived in the Taiga east of Lake Athabasca far east to Hudson Bay, at Reindeer Lake, Hatchet Lake, Wollaston Lake and Lac Brochet
 Kkrest'ayle kke ottine ('dwellers among the quaking aspens' or 'trembling aspen people') lived in the boreal forests between Great Slave Lake in the south and Great Bear Lake in the north.
 Sayisi Dene (Saı́yısı́ dëne) (or Saw-eessaw-dinneh - 'people of the east') traded at Fort Chipewyan. Their hunting and tribal areas extended between Lake Athabasca and Great Slave Lake, and along the Churchill River.
 Gáne-kúnan-hot!ínne (Gąnı̨ kuę hót'ı̨ne) ('jack-pine home they-dwell') lived in the taiga east of Lake Athabasca and were particularly centered along the eastern Fond-du-Lac area.
 Des-nèdhè-kkè-nadè (Dësnëdhé k'e náradé dëne) (Desnedekenade, Desnedhé hoį́é nadé hot'įnę́ - 'people along the great river') were also known as Athabasca Chipewyan. They lived between Great Slave Lake and Lake Athabasca along the Slave River near Fort Resolution (Deninoo Kue - 'moose Island').
 Thilanottine (Tthı́lą́ne hót'ı̨ne) (Tu tthílá hot'įnę́ - 'those who dwell at the head of the lakes' or 'people of the end of the head') lived along the lakes of the Upper Churchill River area, along the Churchill River and Athabasca River, from Great Slave Lake and Lake Athabasca in the north to Cold Lake and Lac la Biche in the southwest.
 Tandzán-hot!ínne (Tálzą́hót'ı̨ne) ('dwellers at the dirty lake', also known as Dení-nu-eke-tówe - 'moose island up lake-on') lived on the northern shore of Great Slave Lake and along the Yellowknife River, and before their expulsion by the Tłı̨chǫ along Coppermine River. They were often regarded as a Chipewyan group, but form as "Yellowknives" historically an independent First Nation and called themselves T'atsaot'ine (T'átsąnót'ı̨ne).

Ethnography

Historically, the Denesuline were allied to some degree with the southerly Cree, and warred against Inuit and other Dene peoples to the north of Chipewyan lands.

An important historic Denesuline is Thanadelthur ("Marten Jumping"), a young woman who early in the 18th century helped her people to establish peace with the Cree, and to get involved with the fur trade (Steckley 1999).

The Sayisi Dene of northern Manitoba are a Chipewyan band notable for hunting migratory caribou. They were historically located at Little Duck Lake and known as the "Duck Lake Dene". In 1956, the government forcibly relocated them to the port of Churchill on the shore of Hudson Bay and a small village north of Churchill called North Knife River, joining other Dene and becoming members of "Fort Churchill Chipewyan Band". In the 1970s, the "Duck Lake Dene" opted for self-reliance, a return to caribou hunting, and relocated to Tadoule Lake, Manitoba, legally becoming "Sayisi Dene First Nation (Tadoule Lake, Manitoba)" in the 1990s. https://uofmpress.ca/books/detail/night-spirits

Culture 
The Chipewyan used to largely be nomadic. They used to be organized into small bands and temporarily lived in tepees. They wore one-piece pants and moccasin outfits. However, their nomadic lifestyle began to erode since 1717 when they encountered English entrepreneurs. The Chipewyan subsequently became important in the subarctic trade by exchanging furs and hides for metal tools, guns, and cloth.

Modern Chipewyan are either fluidly sedentary or semi-nomadic in lifestyle. Many still practice their traditional lifestyle for subsistence like fishing or hunting caribou although this process is modernized with the use of modern nets, tools, transportation and more.

Language 

Denesuline (Chipewyan) speak the Denesuline language, of the Athabaskan linguistic group. Denesuline is spoken by Aboriginal people in Canada whose name for themselves is a cognate of the word  ("people"):  (or ). Speakers of the language speak different dialects but understand each other. There is a 'k', t dialect that most people speak. For example, people in Fond du lac,  speak the 'k' and say  while others who use the 't' say .

The name Chipewyan is, like many people of the Canadian prairies, of Algonquian origin.

Most Chipewyan people now use Dene and Denesuline to describe themselves and their language. The Saskatchewan communities of Fond-du-Lac, Black Lake and Wollaston Lake are a few.

Despite the superficial similarity of the names, the Chipewyan are not related to the Chippewa (Ojibwa) people.

In 2015, Shene Catholique-Valpy, a Chipewyan woman in the Northwest Territories, challenged the territorial government over its refusal to permit her to use the ʔ character in her daughter's name, Sahaiʔa. The territory argued that territorial and federal identity documents were unable to accommodate the character. Sahaiʔa's mother finally registered her name with a hyphen in place of the ʔ, while continuing to challenge the policy. Shortly afterward, another woman named Andrea Heron also challenged the territory on the same grounds, for refusing to accept the ʔ character in her daughter's Slavey name, Sakaeʔah (actually a cognate of Sahaiʔa).

Notable Chipewyan 
 Matonabbee (Matąnebı́)    
 Thanadelthur (Thánadëltth'ér)
 Louis Riel was a grandson of a Chipewyan 
 Jimmy Herman actor from Cold Lake First Nation.

References

Further reading

 Athabasca Chipewyan First Nation. Footprints on the Land: Tracing the Path of the Athabasca Chipewyan First Nation. Fort Chipewyan, Alta: Athabasca Chipewyan First Nation, 2003. 
 Birket-Smith, Kaj. Contributions to Chipewyan Ethnology. Copenhagen: Gyldendal, 1930.
 Bone, Robert M., Earl N. Shannon, and Stewart Raby. The Chipewyan of the Stony Rapids Region; A Study of Their Changing World with Special Attention Focused Upon Caribou. Mawdsley memoir, 1. Saskatoon: Institute for Northern Studies, University of Saskatchewan, 1973. 
Bussidor, Ila, Usten Bilgen-Reinart. "Night Spirits: The Story of the Relocation of the Sayisi Dene." University of Manitoba Press, March 16, 2000. (Memoir of a Dene Woman's experiences in Churchill, Manitoba.)
 Clayton-Gouthro, Cecile M. Patterns in Transition: Moccasin Production and Ornamentation of the Janvier Band Chipewyan. Mercury series. Hull, Quebec: Canadian Museum of Civilization, 1994. 
 Cook, Eung-Do. 2006. The Patterns of Consonantal Acquisition and Change in Chipewyan (Dene Suline). International Journal of American Linguistics. 72, no. 2: 236.
 Dramer, Kim, and Frank W. Porter. The Chipewyan. New York: Chelsea House, 1996. 
 Elford, Leon W., and Marjorie Elford. English-Chipewyan Dictionary. Prince Albert, Sask: Northern Canada Evangelical Mission, 1981.
 Goddard, Pliny Earle. Texts and Analysis of Cold Lake Dialect, Chipewyan. Anthropological papers of the American Museum of Natural History, v. 10, pt. 1–2. New York: Published by order of the Trustees [of the American Museum of Natural History], 1912.
 Grant, J. C. Boileau. Anthropometry of the Chipewyan and Cree Indians of the Neighbourhood of Lake Athabaska. Ottawa: F.A. Acland, printer, 1930.
 Human Relations Area Files, inc. Chipewyan ND07. EHRAF collection of ethnography. New Haven, Conn: Human Relations Area Files, 2001.
 Irimoto, Takashi. Chipewyan Ecology: Group Structure and Caribou Hunting System. Senri ethnological studies, no. 8. Suita, Osaka, Japan: National Museum of Ethnology, 1981.
 Li, Fang-kuei, and Ronald Scollon. Chipewyan Texts. Nankang, Taipei: Institute of History and Philology, Academia Sinica, 1976.
 Lowie, Robert Harry. Chipewyan Tales. New York: The Trustees, 1912.
 Paul, Simon. Introductory Chipewyan: Basic Vocabulary. Saskatoon: Indian and Northern Education, University of Saskatchewan, 1972.
 Scollon, Ronald, and Suzanne B. K. Scollon. Linguistic Convergence: An Ethnography of Speaking at Fort Chipewyan, Alberta. New York: Academic Press, 1979. 
 Shapiro, Harry L. The Alaskan Eskimo; A Study of the Relationship between the Eskimo and the Chipewyan Indians of Central Canada. New York: American Museum of Natural History, 1931.
 Sharp, Henry S. Chipewyan Marriage. Mercury series. Ottawa: National Museum of Canada, 1979.
 Sharp, Henry S. The Transformation of Bigfoot: Maleness, Power, and Belief Among the Chipewyan. Smithsonian series in ethnographic inquiry. Washington, D.C.: Smithsonian Institution Press, 1988. 
 VanStone, James W. The Changing Culture of the Snowdrift Chipewyan. Ottawa: [Queen's Printer], 1965.
 Wilhelm, Andrea. Telicity and Durativity: A Study of Aspect in Dëne Sųłiné (Chipewyan) and German. New York: Routledge, 2007.

External links
Official website

Dene peoples
Algonquian ethnonyms
First Nations in Alberta
First Nations in Saskatchewan
First Nations in the Northwest Territories
First Nations in Manitoba
First Nations in British Columbia